The American avocet (Recurvirostra americana) is a large wader in the avocet and stilt family, Recurvirostridae, that is found in North America. It spends much of its time foraging in shallow water or on mud flats, often sweeping its bill from side to side in water as it seeks its crustacean and insect prey.

Taxonomy
The American avocet was formally described in 1789 by the German naturalist Johann Friedrich Gmelin in his revised and expanded edition of Carl Linnaeus's Systema Naturae. He placed it with the pied avocet in the genus Recurvirostra and coined the binomial name Recurvirostra americana. Gmelin based his description on that by the English ornithologist John Latham who in 1785 had described and illustrated the American avocet in his A General Synopsis of Birds. Latham cited the earlier publication by William Dampier and also that by Thomas Pennant. The genus name combines the Latin  meaning 'bent' or 'curved backwards' with  meaning 'bill'. The species is monotypic: no subspecies are recognised.

The American avocet is a member of the order Charadriiformes, which includes shorebirds, gulls, and alcids. Its family, Recurvirostridae, includes stilts and avocets. The genus Recurvirostra includes three other species: the Andean avocet, the pied avocet, and the red-necked avocet.

Description
It is long, surpassing twice the length of the avocet's small, rounded head. Like many waders, the avocet has long, slender legs and slightly webbed feet. The legs are a pastel grey-blue, giving it its colloquial name, blue shanks. The plumage is black and white on the back, with white on the underbelly. During the breeding season, the plumage is brassy orange on the head and neck, continuing somewhat down to the breast. After the breeding season, these bright feathers are swapped out for white and grey ones. The avocet commonly preens its feathers - this is considered to be a comfort movement.

The call has been described as both a shrill and melodic alarm , which rises in inflection over time. Avocets use three distinct calls: common call, excited call, and broken wing call. The common call is a loud repeated . The excited call has a similar  sound, but it speeds up rather than having an even rhythm. Lastly, the broken wing call is noticeably different from the other two calls. It is a distressed screech sound and is alarming rather than melodic.

Distribution and habitat
American avocets were previously found across most of the United States until extirpated from the East Coast. The breeding habitat consists of marshes, beaches, prairie ponds, and shallow lakes in the mid-west, as far north as southern Canada.  These breeding grounds are largely in areas just east of the rocky mountains including parts of Alberta, Saskatchewan, Montana, Idaho, Washington, Utah, North and South Dakota, Nebraska, Colorado, and even down to parts of New Mexico, Oklahoma and Texas. Their migration route lands them in almost every state in the western United States. The avocet's wintering grounds are mainly coastal. Along the Atlantic Ocean, they are found in North and South Carolina, Georgia and Florida. There are also wintering grounds along the Gulf of Mexico in Florida, Texas, and Mexico, and along the Pacific Ocean in California and Mexico. There are resident populations in the Mexican States of Zacatecas, San Luis Potosí, Guanajuato, Hidalgo, Mexico City and Puebla, and in Central California.

Flocks ranging from 50 to 300 avocets migrate together to their breeding sites together during peak season, which is typically in the spring.

Behavior and ecology

Breeding 

The American avocet breeds in anything from freshwater to hypersaline wetlands in the western and mid-west United States. After reaching their breeding grounds, the avocets quickly establish territory in pairs. Throughout the breeding season, these pairs engage in a series of copulatory displays, which is initiated by either sex and often involves preening. After breeding, the birds gather in large flocks, sometimes amounting to hundreds of birds. Nesting takes place near water, often alongside black-necked stilts, usually on small islands or mucky shorelines. The avocets nest on the ground in places with little to no surrounding vegetation. They make shallow indentations in the ground for their nest and line it with grass, feathers, pebbles or other small objects. Some avocets do not line their nests at all. During the breeding season, avocets lay around 3–5 eggs, with 4 being the most common number. One case study of the 1968 and 1969 breeding seasons suggests that this number allows for the highest rate of hatching success. They incubate them over a period of 23–25 days. Both parents are involved in the incubation process, taking turns during the day (except at night, where only the female incubates the eggs). Both parents take care of the newborn American avocets after they hatch. Male parents are more present in incubation during the first 8 days, whereas female parents dominate incubation throughout the remaining 16 days. Time spent caring for newborn chicks equates to that spent incubating. Since newborns are able to walk, they are capable of feeding themselves and do not require extensive care from their parents. The young are expected to begin flying 4 to 5 weeks after hatching.

Anti-predator behavior 
Each pair defends their own territory against predators and other avocets. Nests are built in areas that predators would struggle to gain access to. Predators that do try to approach the colony find themselves surrounded by several adult avocets running around, trying to distract them. While incubating however, the avocets tend only to their nest and defense is considered a lower priority, unless the eggs are in immediate danger, in which case the avocets may take more aggressive measures, calling loudly and flying at the threat.

Food and feeding 
The American avocet tends to prefer habitats with fine sediments for foraging. In the winter, it feeds extensively on brine shrimp. Usually, this entails the avocet pecking while walking or wading on the shore, but it can also swim to expand foraging area. During the breeding season, avocets continue to eat brine shrimp but switch mainly to consuming brine flies. Brine flies and brine fly larvae are so abundant in avocet breeding grounds that they often blacken the surface of any exposed mud. Brine flies sustain the avocet during its breeding season. The avocet employs both visual and tactile methods of feeding. The primary visual feeding method is pecking at flies. However the avocet will also feed by plunging (wherein the head and neck of the bird are submerged), snatching (wherein the bird catches a flying insect), and bill pursuit (wherein the bird repeatedly opens and closes its bill while moving its head along the surface of the water). Methods of tactile feeding include filtering, scraping, and scythe feeding.

Threats and conservation status 

Shooting and trapping of American avocets led to population decline until the 1900s. During this time, the species was extirpated from most of the East Coast of the United States. By 1918, Avocets became protected under the Migratory Bird Treaty Act (16 U.S.C. 703-712). Since that time, other threats have emerged. Contaminants and toxins such as DDT, selenium, and methylmercury, have increased in American Avocet habitats in recent years. Although the effects are highly contested, these increased concentrations have potential negative effects on American avocet breeding success, especially because Avocet chicks are more susceptible to environmental disruptions than adults. The avocet also faces habitat loss. While agricultural and industrial environments have become alternate habitat for the avocet, natural wetlands are decreasing rapidly. Additionally, increases in the salinity levels of wetlands have had adverse effects on the breeding and development of avocets. Young avocets in saline or hypersaline environments often combat weight loss and dehydration. Although American avocets face numerous environmental challenges, numbers have stayed steady, and according to the National Audubon Society, numbers have been increasing steadily in the eastern United States for the past few years. The American avocet is protected under the Migratory Bird Treaty Act of 1918.

In culture 
In his famous The Birds of America, John James Audubon describes a day of stalking and spying on the avocet. He judiciously noted their foraging, nesting, defensive, and flight behaviors.

Gallery

References

External links
 American avocet - Recurvirostra americana - USGS Patuxent Bird Identification InfoCenter
 American avocet species account – Cornell Lab of Ornithology
 
 
 

American avocet
Native birds of the Canadian Prairies
Birds of the United States
Native birds of the Western United States
Birds of Mexico
American avocet
American avocet